Ellen Brockhöft, née Rehra, (29 April 1893 – 19 December 1977) was a German figure skater. Competing in ladies' singles, she was a two-time world silver medalist and a seven-time German national champion. She represented Germany at the 1928 Winter Olympics and finished ninth. Brockhöft was a member of Berliner Schlittschuhclub. During her skating career she claimed to be younger than her real age, believing this would help her career. She retired from amateur sport in 1929 and became a coach in St. Moritz.

Results

References

Further reading
 

1893 births
1977 deaths
German female single skaters
Figure skaters at the 1928 Winter Olympics
Olympic figure skaters of Germany
World Figure Skating Championships medalists
Figure skaters from Berlin